The 2018 UEFA Europa League Final was the final match of the 2017–18 UEFA Europa League, the 47th season of Europe's secondary club football tournament organised by UEFA, and the 9th season since it was renamed from the UEFA Cup to the UEFA Europa League. It was played at the Parc Olympique Lyonnais in Décines-Charpieu, Lyon, France on 16 May 2018, between French side Marseille and Spanish side Atlético Madrid.

Atlético Madrid won the match 3–0 for their third Europa League title. As winners, Atlético Madrid earned the right to play against the winners of the 2017–18 UEFA Champions League, Real Madrid, in the 2018 UEFA Super Cup. They also qualified to enter the group stage of the 2018–19 UEFA Champions League, but since they already qualified through their league performance, the berth reserved was given to the third-placed team of the 2017–18 Ligue 1, Lyon, as Ligue 1 was the 5th-ranked association according to next season's access list.

Teams
In the following table, finals until 2009 were in the UEFA Cup era, since 2010 were in the UEFA Europa League era.

Venue

The Parc Olympique Lyonnais was announced as the final venue on 9 December 2016, following the decision of the UEFA Executive Committee meeting in Nyon, Switzerland.

Background
Marseille reached their third final after a 3–2 aggregate win against Austrian side Red Bull Salzburg, clinched after extra time. They lost the final in both previous occasions (1999 and 2004). This was also their fifth final in all seasonal UEFA competitions, having also played in two European Cup/Champions League finals (winning in 1993; and losing in 1991).

Atlético Madrid also reached their third final after a 2–1 aggregate win against English side Arsenal. They won the final in both previous occasions (2010 and 2012). This was also their ninth final in UEFA seasonal competitions, having played in three European Cup/Champions League finals (losing in 1974, 2014 and 2016) and three Cup Winners' Cup final (winning in 1962; and losing in 1963 and 1986).

The two teams had played each other twice in the Champions League. Atlético Madrid won the first match, while the second was drawn in the 2008–09 UEFA Champions League group stage.

Road to the final

Note: In all results below, the score of the finalist is given first (H: home; A: away).

Pre-match

Ambassador

The ambassador for the final was former French international Eric Abidal, who played three seasons at Lyon and later won two UEFA Champions League titles with Barcelona.

Ticketing
With a stadium capacity of 57,000 for the final, a total amount of 23,000 tickets were available to fans and the general public, with the two finalist teams receiving tickets (number to be confirmed) each and with the other tickets being available for sale to fans worldwide via UEFA.com from 15 to 22 March 2018 in four price categories: €150, €100, €70, and €45. The remaining tickets were allocated to the local organising committee, UEFA and national associations, commercial partners and broadcasters, and to serve the corporate hospitality programme.

Opening ceremony
French DJ duo Ofenbach performed at the opening ceremony preceding the final.

Match

Officials
On 7 May 2018, UEFA announced that Dutchman Björn Kuipers would officiate the final. It was the second time he was appointed for a UEFA Europa League final, as he had already been the referee in the 2013 final. He was also the referee for the 2014 UEFA Champions League Final, which Atlético lost to Real Madrid in extra time. He was joined by his fellow countrymen, with Sander van Roekel and Erwin Zeinstra as assistant referees, Danny Makkelie and Pol van Boekel as additional assistant referees, and Mario Diks as reserve assistant referee. The fourth official for the final was Szymon Marciniak from Poland.

Summary
In the 21st minute, André-Frank Zambo Anguissa miss-controlled a pass out from goalkeeper Steve Mandanda, the ball came to Gabi who passed into Antoine Griezmann who scored with a low shot into the bottom left corner. Marseille captain Dimitri Payet left the match due to injury in the 32nd minute. It was 2–0 in the 49th minute when Antoine Griezmann dinked the ball past the advancing Steve Mandanda and into the bottom left from inside the penalty area after a pass from Koke. Gabi got the third goal in the 89th minute with a low right foot finish from the right after another pass from Koke.

Details
The "home" team (for administrative purposes) was determined by an additional draw held after the semi-final draw, which was held on 13 April 2018, 12:00 CEST, at the UEFA headquarters in Nyon, Switzerland.

Statistics

See also
2018 UEFA Champions League Final
2018 UEFA Super Cup
Atlético Madrid in European football
Olympique de Marseille in European football

Notes

References

External links
UEFA Europa League (official website)
UEFA Europa League history: 2017/18
2018 UEFA Europa League final: Lyon, UEFA.com

2018
Final
Europa League Final
International club association football competitions hosted by France
Olympique de Marseille matches
Atlético Madrid matches
Europa League Final
Sports competitions in Lyon
May 2018 sports events in France